The Ordnance BL 12-pounder 6 cwt was a lighter version of the British 12-pounder 7 cwt gun, used by the Royal Horse Artillery in the late 19th and early 20th centuries.

History 
Problems arose when the standard BL 12-pounder 7 cwt gun was used in the great Indian cavalry manoeuvres of 1891. The carriage was found to be too complicated, and dust caused the metal surfaces of the axle traversing device to seize. It also proved too heavy for horse artillery, which was intended to support cavalry in battle, to manoeuvre.

The 12-pounder 6 cwt gun was therefore developed in 1892, when the new more powerful cordite replaced gunpowder, as a lighter version of the BL 12-pounder 7 cwt gun. It had a barrel  shorter, on a lighter and simpler carriage, and it entered service in 1894. In 1899 a primitive recoil-absorbing system was added. The weapon was made obsolete in British service by the acquisition of the modern quick-firing Ehrhardt QF 15-pounder in 1901, and was replaced by that and later by the QF 13-pounder from 1905.

The No. 57 "Blue" Fuze was introduced during the Boer war.

Combat use

Second Boer War 
The gun was used by the Royal Horse Artillery, and together with the BL 15-pounder, it provided the main British firepower. Eighteen guns were also used by the Royal Canadian Artillery in this war. A total of 78 guns fired 36,161 shells.

World War I 
A battery of 6 guns served in the East African Campaign as the 8th Field Battery. It arrived with the Calcutta Artillery Volunteers in October 1914, and the guns were towed by teams of oxen.

See also 
 Field artillery
 List of field guns

Surviving examples 

 The Central Museum of The Royal Regiment of Canadian Artillery, Shilo Manitoba
 One piece made in 1901 and marked "RCD 1907" on gun-metal sight mount, with King Edward VII cypher and crown inletted in top of barrel, parked in front of Stethem Hall, the HQ building of CFB Kingston.
 Gun used by "D" Battery, Royal Canadian Field Artillery, at Leliefontein. Preserved at the Canadian War Museum

 The Royal Navy State Funeral Gun Carriage, used to carry the coffin of the deceased during State funerals in the United Kingdom. In this role it is not pulled by horses but by ratings of the Royal Navy. State funerals are normally reserved for the monarch although a few notable non-monarch individuals like Winston Spencer Churchill and Lord Mountbatten have been given this honour, the most recent such funeral being Queen Elizabeth II's on 19th September 2022.

Notes

References

Bibliography 
 Text Book of Gunnery, 1902. LONDON : PRINTED FOR HIS MAJESTY'S STATIONERY OFFICE, BY HARRISON AND SONS, ST. MARTIN'S LANE 
 Dale Clarke, British Artillery 1914–1919. Field Army Artillery. Osprey Publishing, Oxford UK, 2004 
 General Sir Martin Farndale, History of the Royal Regiment of Artillery: Forgotten Fronts and the Home Base 1914–18 
 Major Darrell D. Hall, "Guns in South Africa 1899-1902" in The South African Military History Society. Military History Journal – Vol 2 No 1, June 1971
 Major Darrell D. Hall, "Field Artillery of the British Army 1860–1960. Part I, 1860 – 1900" in The South African Military History Society. Military History Journal – Vol 2 No 4, December 1972 (web page is incorrectly titled 1900–1914)
 I.V. Hogg & L.F. Thurston, British Artillery Weapons & Ammunition 1914–1918. London: Ian Allan, 1972

External links 

 Handbook for the 12-PR. B.L., 6 cwt. gun, mark I-IV Horse artillery: 1896, 1898, 1901, 1903, 1905
 Diagram of 12pr B.L. 6cwt Field Mark I & II from Victorian Forts and Artillery website

Artillery of the United Kingdom
Field guns
World War I guns
World War I artillery of the United Kingdom
76 mm artillery